The paired sublingual glands are major salivary glands in the mouth. They are the smallest, most diffuse, and the only unencapsulated major salivary glands. They provide only 3-5% of the total salivary volume.  There are also two other types of salivary glands; they are submandibular and parotid glands.

Structure
They lie anterior and superior to the submandibular gland and inferior and lateral to the tongue, as well as beneath the mucous membrane of the floor of the mouth. They are bounded laterally by the bone of the mandible and inferolaterally by the mylohyoid muscle.  The glands can be felt behind each mandibular canine. Placing one index finger within the mouth and the fingertips of the opposite hand outside it, the compressed gland is manually palpated between the inner and outer fingers.

The sublingual glands are drained by 8-20 excretory ducts called the ducts of Rivinus. The largest of all, the sublingual duct (of Bartholin) joins the submandibular duct to drain through the sublingual caruncle. The sublingual caruncle is a small papilla near the midline of the floor of the mouth on each side of the lingual frenum. Most of the remaining small sublingual ducts (of Rivinus) open separate into the mouth on an elevated crest of mucous membrane, the plica sublingualis (aka sublingual fold), formed by the gland and located on either side of the frenulum linguae.

Microanatomy
The sublingual gland consists mostly of mucous acini capped with serous demilunes and is therefore categorized as a mixed mucous gland with a mucous product predominating. Striated and intercalated ducts are also present.

Blood supply
The gland receives its blood supply from the sublingual and submental arteries. Lymph from the sublingual salivary gland drains into the submandibular lymph nodes.

Nerve supply
The chorda tympani nerve (from the facial nerve via the submandibular ganglion) is secretomotor and provides parasympathetic supply to the sublingual glands. The path of the nerve is as follows: junction between pons and medulla, through internal acoustic meatus and facial canal to chorda tympani, through middle ear cavity, out petrotympanic fissure to join the lingual nerve, travels with lingual nerve to synapse at the submandibular ganglion, then postganglionic fibers travels to the sublingual gland.

Development
The sublingual salivary glands appear in the eighth week of prenatal development, two weeks later than the other two major salivary glands. They develop from epithelial buds in the sulcus surrounding the sublingual folds on the floor of the mouth, lateral to the developing submandibular gland. These buds branch and form into cords that canalize to form the sublingual ducts associated with the gland. The rounded terminal ends of the cords form acini.

Clinical significance

Ranulas are the most common pathologic lesion associated with the sublingual glands.

Additional images

References

External links
  - "Oral Cavity: Glands"
 
 
 Salivary gland infections from Medline Plus
 Salivary gland cancer from American Cancer Society

Glands of mouth